Percy Hilder Miles (12 July 1878 – 18 April 1922) was an English composer, violinist and academic. For most of his career he was Professor of Harmony at the Royal Academy of Music. Among his students at was the composer Rebecca Clarke, and among Miles' associates was Lionel Tertis. 

He was a prolific composer of 160 or so works, most of them unpublished.

Early life

Miles was born in Crayford, Kent, to parents George Miles (a building contractor) and Fanny Hood, of Bexleyheath, Kent on 12 July 1878. Percy's earliest compositions date from when he was 8 years-old and at the age of 13, he performed the Beethoven Violin Concerto at St. James' Hall, Piccadilly, with the Principal of the Royal Academy of Music, Alexander MacKenzie, conducting. Percy became a student at the Royal Academy of Music from June 1893. His teachers there included Francis William Davenport (for harmony), Walter Battison Haynes (for composition) and violinist Hans Wessely.

Studies and awards
In 1895 Miles suggested to Lionel Tertis (then also a violin pupil of Wessely at the RAM) the idea of switching to the viola, in order for them to form a string quartet.  
His name appeared several times in The Musical Times in the late 1890s connected with performances of his own compositions and for those of other contemporaries. According to a brief biography in one of these articles in 1899, he won the Hine Exhibition composition prize in 1893, the Walter MacFarren Scholarship in 1896 (awarded 8 January 1896) Also in 1896 he received a silver medal (presented annually to the most distinguished student at the Royal Academy of Music, the Royal College of Music, or the Guildhall School of Music, in rotation, the recipient nominated by the principal or director of the school) from the Worshipful Company of Musicians.  He won the first Sauret prize in 1897, plus the prestigious Charles Lucas (musician) Medal for composition in mid summer 1898. In 1899 he was awarded the Mendelssohn Scholarship, which was presented to him by Sir John Stainer. This enabled the student to study abroad for 3 years with noted teachers of the day. Between 1899 and 1903, Percy studied in Vienna, Berlin, Karlsruhe, Paris and Milan. As a student he also performed alongside his violin teacher Hans Wessely as second violin for chamber music concerts across London.

Professional life and Rebecca Clarke
He was made a sub-professor at the RAM in 1899 and in 1903, upon his return from Mendelssohn Scholarship studies, Percy became a full professor of Harmony and Counterpoint. Among his Harmony students was Rebecca Clarke who studied there from 1903 to 1905. He had become a friend of the Clarke family in the years before and had recommended she study Harmony with him and the violin with Wessely. However her father removed her from the RAM when Miles suddenly proposed marriage and kissed her after a lesson in 1905. This led to her being enrolled in the Royal College of Music where she studied composition with Charles Villiers Stanford, who suggested she take up the viola which she later studied with Percy's friend Lionel Tertis.

In 1906 (at Wessely's suggestion), Miles became an overseas examiner for the Associated Board of the Royal Schools of Music. This led to long periods of travel across the British Empire, including Australia 
. Percy went around the world no fewer than six times, sometimes visiting his brothers in Canada and relatives in Jamaica and Australia. One of his cousins was the famous Australian water colourist J J Hilder.

A cello concerto by Miles initially dedicated to and rehearsed with Herbert Withers (1880–1961) was announced for performance on 3 September 1908 in Henry Wood's Promenade Concerts. However it was not in fact performed as Miles voyaged to Australia in April 1908 and the orchestral parts were not completed in time. Instead Withers performed the Dvorak Concerto and Percy put a line through the dedication to Withers. The orchestral score is lost, but the cello and piano accompaniment parts survive.

Financially secure from Examining, though still living with his parents in Erith, he paid off his father's mortgage and debts and in 1909 he purchased a grand piano and a Stradivarius violin made in 1720, known as the "General Kyd”. He bequeathed this to Rebecca Clarke in his Last Will and Testament of 1912.

Although aged 36 at the outbreak of World War I, Percy was keen to enlist. Indeed, despite his age he was called-up several times and presented himself at Woolwich. However he failed the medical on each occasion, either because of his eyesight or weak lungs.

He was reluctant to have his works published although a handful were; his biggest success came in 1920 when his String Sextet, (alongside works by Sir George Dyson, Charles Villiers Stanford and Gustav Holst) was selected from 64 entries for the Carnegie Collection of British Music award, the prize being publication of the score by Stainer & Bell.

Death
In 1922 Miles went blind in one eye and also caught pneumonia which took his life on 18 April of that year. According to his catalogue, he left over 160 works, (mainly chamber music and songs), most of which his mother sent to his brothers in Canada after his death. Some are now deemed lost but there are around 100 manuscripts still with relatives in Canada and around 40 survive in the RAM Archive. He never married and lies buried with his parents in Brook Street cemetery, Erith.

List of compositions
Compositions, mostly in Manuscript, held by the Royal Academy of Music Archive, London include:

1891 Vocal duet "Now and Afterward"
1893 Song for Sop., Vln., Cello & Pft. "A Golden Radiance" Words by E. Nesbit
1893 Song for voice and piano,  "Sing to me" Words by Fr.Ryan
1893 2 Canons for 2 voices and piano, "Sunset" and "The Singer"
1894 Slow movement (only) of Sonata in A minor for violin and piano
1894 Song "Weariness" Words by Longfellow
1894 Song "When you were here" Words by L Jackson
1894 Song "The Seasons" Words by Jane Hood
1894–1901 Quintet in A maj for 2 Vlns. 2 vlas. and cello
1895 Song "My lady fair" Words by M E Sargent
1895 2 songs for voice and piano "When grief shall come to thee", "Go down, thou ruddy sun"
1896 Love song for voice and piano "To the cold, dark night" Words by Harold Miles Silvanus
1897 Waltz in F sharp minor for piano
1897 Septet in E flat for Vln, Vla, Cello, Bass, Clt, Hrn, & Bassoon. (viola part only)
1898–1902 4 sets of Variations on Beethoven's "Das Blumchen Wunderhold" for violin, viola & cello
1899 5 Songs, words by Robert Burns
1900 3 Lieder  – "Abendlied", words by Edmund Hoefer, "Am Wege" words by Max Kalbeck, "Im Walde" words by Ludwig Bowitsch
1900 3 Songs to words by Ossian- "Pleasant is thy voice, O Carril", "Daughter of Heaven", "Come thou beam"
1900 3 Fantasy-Pieces for Cello & Piano
1901 Quintet in F minor for 2 Vlns., Vla, Cello & Bass
1901 8 Songs for voice & piano. Words by Heine
1902 3 Fantasy-pieces for string quartet, (Published by Bote & Bock)
1902 Quintet in D for 2 Vlns., Vla., Cello & Bass (in one movt.)
1902 18 Metamorphoses on a theme intended to represent a pet dog named "Don" for Vln., Vla., & Cello
1902-3 Variations for string quartet on an original theme in A minor
1903-4 Quintet for Clarinet, 2 Vlns., Vla., & Cello
1904 4 Songs to words by Swinburne
1906 3 Shakespeare Sonnets for voice & piano
1906 Duet for Vla. & Cello arr. for Vln. & Vla by W Maurice Miles
1906 Quartet for 4 Cellos, for W.M.Miles
1907 Grand Solo for viola in G, ("To Johnson. So difficult as to be absolutely impossible") for G.D.Miles
1907-8 Cello Concerto in D, Piano & Cello parts (Proms 1908 commission)
1909 Rhapsody in Eb for violin & piano (No.3 of 3 Pieces for Violin & Piano)
1911 Trio No.1 in D for 2 violins & viola
1914–15 3 Pieces for Violin & Piano- 1.Intermezzo 2. Capriccio 3. Romanza (Published by Stainer & Bell 1920)
1914–16 Cello Sonata in C for Cello & Piano
1912–17 Sextet in G minor for 2 Vlns., 2 Vlas., Cello & Bass (Published by Stainer & Bell 1920) 
Winner of Carnegie Trust Award (alongside Holst's "Hymn of Jesus" and Stanford 5th Symphony)
1917 "Sunshine over the Avon" for solo piano. (parody of Schoenberg, written "whilst waiting for dinner")
1918 5 Pieces (Interludes) for piano solo
1919 2 Songs for voice & piano "In Flanders Fields" words by Lt. Col. John McRae, "England & Flanders" words by H.C F
1921 3 Easy Pieces for Violin & Piano (Published posthumously by The Associated Board in Aug 1922)

Miscellaneous items also held by RAM Archive
 Catalog(sic) of the Musical Compositions of Percy Hilder Miles Dec 1907– (updated to 1921). Contains listings of approximately 180 works with dates and locations of composition.
Two pages from The Strad, vol.XXXI no.370, February 1921 concerning the collection of violins made by George Miles
Viola part to Stephen Foster's "Old Folks at Home"

Manuscripts held by Percy's great nephew William Stantan Miles in Canada

1886 3 Duets facile for 2 violins (Op.1)
1888 Trio in C for 3 Violins (Op.3)
1893 Song for Sop., Vln., Cello & Pft. "A Golden Radiance" Words by E. Nesbit (parts & score)
1893 2 Piano trios in C min & D min 
1893 One movt. of a string quartet in G "Quartette facile"
1893 Song "Greeting" for voice & piano (won Hine prize at RAM Dec 1893)
1893 Trio in D min for 2 violins & cello
1893-4 Piano Trio in E min (parts & score) 
1894 6 Canons for 2 voices & piano
1894 Cello Sonata in A min
1894 Violin Sonata in A min  
1894 2 string quartets- G min & E maj
1894 3 duets for violin & cello- in G, A & D min
1894 6 studies for violin 
1894 2 movts. of a string quartet in G min 
1894 Melody in G for violin & piano 
1894 6 Albumleaves for piano 
1894 Piano quartet in G min 
1894 Romance & Polacca for cello & piano 
1894 Violin Sonata in G
1894 Song "Weariness" Words by Longfellow
1894–1901 Quintet in A for 2 Vlns., 2 Vlas. & Cello (score & parts)
1895 Trio in C maj for Vln., Vla. & Cello
1895 2 Children's pieces in A & G for violin & piano (arr. for Cello & piano c.1900)
1895 Serenade- Duet for Vln. & Cello in Eb
1895 3 Duets for female voices and piano (No.1- "Life and Song" words by R E Burton- only) 
1895 3 Quartets for SATB & piano
1895 Piano Trio in C min 
1895 Te Deum in E flat SATB choir & piano 
1895 "Autumn song" for tenor, violin & piano. Words by Wilfred Browne 
1895-6 6 Songs with piano 
1896 6 Songs with piano
1896 Andante in A flat for piano
1896 Andante & Rondo for violin & piano 
1896 2 sets of variations (in D & G min) on original themes for string quartet 
1896 4 Part Songs (Madrigals) in 5 & 6 parts 
1896 String quartet in A
1896 2 movts. of a violin sonata in D (composed for RAM Charles Lucas Prize- unsuccessful) 
1896 3 Love-songs for tenor with piano. Words by Harold Silvanus 
1897 Set of variations on a theme by F W Hood for string quartet
1897 Septet in E flat for Vln., Vla., Cello, Bass, Clt., Hrn. & Bassoon- (score) 
1897 Mass in D for soli, chorus & orchestra (piano score) 
1897 Waltz in F sharp min for piano
1897 Fantasy in D for Violin & Orchestra. (score & parts) 
1897-8 7 trios for Vln., Vla. & Cello (score)
1898 Song for voice and piano "A Song of Dawn" published by Augener & Co. London
1898 Piano Quintet in D (one movt.) 
1898 Flute quartet in D 
1898 Andante & Rondo in A for piano quintet (winner of Lucas prize at RAM)
1898 6 Fantasy pieces for violin & piano
1898 5 Lieder for voice & piano (words by Hebbel, Heine and Hauff)
1898 Anthem for Tenor, Chorus & Organ "Lord thou hast been our refuge" Psalm XC  
1898-9 3 Songs. Words by Walter Monck
1898–1902 4 sets of Variations on Beethoven's "Das Blumchen Wunderhold" for violin, viola & cello 
1899 2 Dances- in A & E flat, for piano quintet
1899 String Quartet in D (score & parts)
1899 Song "From Oversea" words by William Sharp
1899 5 Songs for voice and piano (words by R Burns)
1899 Dance in C for Piano Quartet  (score & parts)
1899–1907 Elegiac Fantasy for orchestra (orchestral score & piano duet version from 1901) 
1900 2 Ballades for piano
1900 Song "Maiden mine"
1900 Piano Quartet in A min (score & parts) 
1900 3 Lieder with piano accompaniment.
1900 Quintet in G for 2 vlns., vla., cello & bass (score)
1900 Song "O Love, my words to thee" words by Chester Ide
1900 3 Songs. Words by Ossian 
1900  (rescored 1909) Violin concerto in G (solo part & score) 
1900 3 Fantasy pieces for cello & piano
1901 2 Bach Fugues arr. for String Quartet & String Trio (parts) 
1901 Quintet in F min for 2 Vlns., Vla., Cello & Bass 
1901 8 Lieder. Words by Heine 
1901 Piano trio in B min
1901-2 Romantic piece for piano & violin in A min
1901-7 Concert piece in A min for violin & orchestra (full score)
1902 3 Fantasy Pieces for string quartet (published by Bote & Bock)
1902 Quintet in D for 2 Vlns., Vla., Cello & Bass (in one movt.)
1903-5 Duet in D for Violin & Cello (parts)
1904 4 songs. Words by Swinburne 
1904 Clarinet quintet in E flat
1904-6 Scherzo for Piano quintet in Ab and E (simultaneously) (score)
1905 5 pieces for string quartet  
1905 5 Canons for SATB voices & piano 
1906 Cello quartet in C (score & parts)
1906 3 Shakespeare sonnets 
1906 Duetlet in D for viola & cello
1906 Song "When day meets night"
1907 Duet in G for 2 violins with piano duet(4 hands) 
1907 Grand Solo for viola in G, ("To Johnson. So difficult as to be absolutely impossible") for G.D.Miles
1907-8 Cello Concerto in D, Piano & Cello parts (Proms 1908 commission)
1909 3 pieces for violin & piano
1910 Violin sonata in Eb 
1910 2 Piano quartets- in C & G
1911 3 Trios for 2 violins & viola
1912 4 Dances for 3 violins & piano
1912 5 Larnier songs for voice & piano
1914–16 4 Movements for 3 violins & piano
1915 arr.of Bach Brandenburg Concerto No.6 for 4 Vlns. & piano (1st movt. only)
1915 arr. of Vivaldi's Violin Concerto in B min, No.10 from L'estro Armonico, for 4 vlns. & piano 
1916 Variations in A for 4 violins & piano 
1916 2 Quartets in C & D for 3 violins & viola 
1916 Cello Sonata in C
1917 Sextet in G min for 2 Vlns., 2 Vlas., Cello & Bass (Published by Stainer & Bell 1920) 
Winner of Carnegie Trust Award (alongside Holst's "Hymn of Jesus" and Stanford 5th Symphony)
1917 Quintet in E min for Piano, Vln., Vla., Cello & Bass 
1917 "Sunshine over the Avon" for solo piano. (parody of Schoenberg, written "whilst waiting for dinner")
1918 2 string quartets- in F & E flat
1918 "Erith suite for strings" (score & parts)
1918 Violin Sonata in A
1919 2 Songs "England & Flanders", "In Flanders fields"
1919 Quintet in D min for 2 Vlns., 2 Vlas., Cello & Bass (Unfinished)
1920 Piano Sonata in A
1920 4 Pieces for 2 violins & piano (In memoriam F W Hood)
1921 Song "My Shirt is a Token"

Miscellaneous items also held by W S Miles:
 Catalog(sic) of the Musical Compositions of Percy Hilder Miles Jan 1918– (updated to 1921 after death). Contains listings of approximately 180 works with dates and locations of composition.
 The letters (117) of Percy Hilder Miles from 1905 to 1921 written to his brother Maurice containing comments on his musical point of view about his compositions and music in general
 General letters (150 approx) written from Percy to his brothers and parents 1906-1920
 Percy Hilder Miles - Royal Academy of Music Harmony Examination results 1894, 1895, 1896.

Manuscripts presumed lost:

 1886 "Autumn leaves" duets for 2 violins (first work listed in Catalog, composed aged 8)
 1887 Introduction book for the violin		
 1887 "Jubilee" book of duets for 2 violins
 1887 Overture "Hydaspes"
 1887 Hymn tune "God will take care of you"
 1887 "Jubilee" Overture
 1887 Overture in G (without name)
 1888 "Frederick William" Overture
 1888? Coronation solo- Air with variations for Vln. & Piano
 1888 "Franchelette" Overture
 1889 Trio in G for 2 Vlns. & Cello
 1890 Trio in D min for 2 Vlns. & Cello	("Wagner trio")
 1890 Morceau de salon in G for violin & piano
 1891 Duet in D for violin & cello
 1891 Piece in F for violin & piano
 1891 Duet in C for violin & cello
 1891 Polonaise for violin & piano 
 1891 Anthem "Praise the Lord O my soul" Psalm CXLVI v1-3
 1891 Pieces for violin alone
 1891 Anthem "We took sweet counsel" Psalm LV v15-17
 1891 Trio in Bb for 2 violins & cello
 1891 Song "Dream singing"
 1891 Trio in D for 2 violins & cello
 1892 Exercises (studies) for violin 
 1892 Violin concerto in D
 1892 Trio in G for 2 Violins & cello
 1892 Meditation for cello & piano
 1892 Oratorio- "Joseph"
 1892 "Love's welcome" Partsong for SATB
 1892 Piano trio in C
 1892 Anthem "Awake up my glory" Psalm LVII v9-10
 1892 Andante in F for cello & piano
 1892 Trio Facile in G for 2 violins & cello
 1892 Trio in F for 2 Violins & cello
 1893 Trio in A for 2 Violins & cello
 1893 Oratorio- "Noah"
 1893 6 short pieces for Organ
 1893 Song "Virtue"
 1893 Song "Sing to me"
 1893 Motet "The lily and the cross"
 1893 Piano trio in F
 1893 Prelude & Fugue in D min for Organ 
 1893 8 Canons for 2,3 & 4 voices & piano*1893 Ballade & Scherzo for violin & piano
 1894 Deus Misereatur Psalm LVXVII for soli, chorus & orch. (unfinished)
 1894 Piano sonata in C min (one movt.)
 1895 Piano quartet in D (one movt.)
 1895 2 Children's pieces in A & G for violin & piano
 1895 Cadenza for Brahms' Violin concerto 
 1895 5 songs for voice & piano (all but 1st lost)
 1895 6 songs for voice & piano
 1895 3 duets for voice & piano (only 2nd and 3rd lost)
 1895 Scherzo in G for string quartet
 1895 Sonatina in C for piano
 1896 Variations in F for piano (unfinished)
 1897 Song "By the stream that the willow is weeping above" words by Harold Miles Silvanus 
 1898 Dance in E min for violin & piano
 1899 Romance in A for cello & piano
 1900 Song "Stay my charmer, can you leave me?" words by Robert Burns
 1900 Song "I looked and saw your eyes"
 1901 Hungarian Song "As utoso viragok" words by Petofi
 1914–15 5 Pieces for violin & piano (Only No.s 4&5 lost)
 1914–15 arr. of Bach Brandenburg Concertos No.s 1,2,4 for 3 vlns. & piano

Works mentioned in Musical Times reviews:

 Piano Trio in C minor 1896 
 Fantasia in D for violin and orchestra (performed 1898)
 Septet 1898 
 String Quartet in D 1899  
 3 Fantasies for strings – performed at the Royal College of Music 6 December 1904
An Andante and Allegro for piano quintet. Won silver medal in a competition in 1905.

Several of Miles' works are available here: https://imslp.org/wiki/Category:Miles%2C_Percy_Hilder as scores or parts and as recordings.

References

Notes

Citations

External links 
 

1878 births
1922 deaths
English classical composers
20th-century classical composers
English Romantic composers
English classical violinists
British male violinists
People from Erith
Musicians from Kent
English male classical composers
20th-century English composers
20th-century British male musicians
19th-century British male musicians
Male classical violinists